Yinghai Subdistrict is a subdistrict of Jiaozhou City, Shandong, People's Republic of China, located south of G22 Qingdao–Lanzhou Expressway southeast of downtown. , it has 47 villages under its administration.

See also 
 List of township-level divisions of Shandong

References 

Township-level divisions of Shandong
Subdistricts of the People's Republic of China
Geography of Qingdao